The 2014 Grambling State Tigers football team represented Grambling State University in the 2014 NCAA Division I FCS football season. The Tigers were led by head coach Broderick Fobbs in the first season of his tenure as head coach. They competed as a member of the West Division of the Southwestern Athletic Conference (SWAC) and played their home games at Eddie Robinson Stadium in Grambling, Louisiana. They finished the season 7–5, 7–2 in SWAC play to finish in second place in the West Division.

Schedule

Schedule Source:

References

Grambling State
Grambling State Tigers football seasons
Grambling State Tigers football